Succès de Films is the title of a recording by Franck Pourcel and his Orchestra, released on La Voix de son Maitre (French His Master's Voice) LP record FELP 149.

Track listing

Side one
 "Gelsomina" from the film "La Strada" (N. Rota)
 "La Fontaine des Amours" from the film of the same name (Jule Styne)
 "Le Grisbi" from the film "Touchez pas au Grisbi" (Jean Wiener)
 "La Chnouf" from the film "razzia sur la Chnouf (Marc Lanjean)
 "La Samba Fantastique" from film of the same name (J. Toledo - J. Manzon - L. Autuori)
 "Mon Cœur est un Violon" from film "Le Petit Garçon Perdu" (M. Laparcerie)
 "Sous les Toits de Paris" from film of same name (Moretti)
 "Escale à Orly" from film of same name (P. Misraki)

Side two
 "Ton Sourire est Dans Mon Cœur" from film "Modern Times" (Charles Chaplin)
 "Un Jour, Tu Verras" from film "Secrets d'Alcôve" (G. Van Parys)
 "Johny Guitare" from film "Johnny Guitar" (Victor Young)
 "Complainte de la Butte" from film "French-Cancan" (G. Van Parys)
 "Tant Que Je Vivais Seul" from film "Ecrit dans le Ciel" (Dmitri Tiomkin)
 "Les Lavandières du Portugal" from film "Mademoiselle de Paris" (André Popp)
 "Chanson de Marty" from film "Marty" (H. Warren)
 "Joue pour Moi" from film "Obsession" (P. Misraki)

References

Instrumental albums